Brokenshire College is a private, non-profit basic and higher education institution administered by the United Church of Christ in the Philippines (UCCP) in Davao City, Philippines. It was founded in 1954 as the Brokenshire School of Nursing and now offers programs in health sciences, theology, business, teacher training, medicine, as well as vocational and K–12 education. The college also administers two satellite campuses: one in Toril, Davao City and another one in General Santos.

The college is named after the Brokenshire Memorial Hospital, which is in turn named after Herbert Cecil Brokenshire, who served as the hospital's director from 1926 until World War II.

History
In the 1900s, Protestant missionaries from the American Board of Commissioners for Foreign Missions (ABCFM) established a small bamboo-and-nipa clinic along Magallanes Street by the banks of Davao River. The clinic later became the Davao Mission Hospital and was the first congregational hospital in Davao City. In 1926, Herbert Cecil Brokenshire from New York City became the hospital director. In his 14-year supervision, the hospital improved its facilities and services. Doctor Brokenshire later died in World War II as a prisoner of war. In 1947, the rebuilt hospital was renamed Brokenshire Memorial Hospital in his honor. The United Church Board for World Ministries (UCBWM) later handed the administration of the hospital to the United Church of Christ in the Philippines (UCCP) in 1951.

In 1954, the Brokenshire School of Nursing was established—the first nursing school in Davao City. However, the hospital along Magallanes Street burned down in the great fire of Davao City on February 10, 1964. In 1969 the hospital and nursing school transferred to their present site in Madapo Hills, Davao City. The Brokenshire School of Nursing was renamed Brokenshire College in 1978 after they began offering programs in liberal arts.

Brokenshire College opened its School of Medicine in 2016. In 2018, the medical school won the national Clinicopathologic Conference (CPC) competition.

Academics
Brokenshire College offers nine bachelor's degrees and two master's degrees. Brokenshire also operates a medical school and offers vocational education as well as kindergarten through 12th grade.

 School of Allied Health
BS in Medical Laboratory Science 
BS in Midwifery
BS in Nursing
BS in Pharmacy
 School of Arts and Science
Bachelor of Elementary Education
BS in Information Technology 
BS in Psychology
MA in Nursing
 School of Business and Management
BS in Business Administration
UCCP Pag-asa School of Theology
BA in Theology
MA in Theology
School of Medicine
Doctor of Medicine
Senior High School
General Academic (GA) Strand
Humanities and Social Sciences (HUMMS)
Accountancy, Business and Management (ABM)
Science, Technology, Engineering and Mathematics (STEM)
Technical-Vocational-Livelihood (TVL) Track
Home Economics (HE)
Information and Communications Technology (ICT)
Basic Education 
Kindergarten

Campuses

Main campus

The main campus of Brokenshire College is situated on a 14-hectare lot in Madapo Hills, Davao City. The compound also houses the Brokenshire Memorial Hospital, Brokenshire Resource Complex, and the Brokenshire Community Health & Development Center.

Toril campus
Brokenshire College Toril is an extension campus located in the Toril district of Davao City. It was founded in 2003 and offers education from kindergarten through high school. In 2004, the campus opened a Bachelor of Science in Nursing program.

Soccsksargen campus
Brokenshire College Soccsksargen is located in General Santos in the Soccsksargen region. It was established in 2004. It offers a program in caregiving accredited by Technical Education and Skills Development Authority (TESDA). The school also offers degrees in accountancy, early childhood education, hotel and restaurant management, nursing, and psychology.

Notes and References 
Notes

References

External links
 
 
Brokenshire College high schools listed at Republic of Philippines Department of Education

Schools in Davao City
Universities and colleges in Davao City
Educational institutions established in 1954
1954 establishments in the Philippines